Kaisa Pajusalu (born 19 February 1989, in Pärnu, Estonia) is a former Estonian rower.

Rowing career
She has won two medals at the Junior World Championship in the double sculls event with Jevgenia Rõndina. In 2009 and 2010 Pajusalu also won a silver medal at the U23 World Championships in the single sculls event. She is also a four-time World champion and four-time European champion in indoor rowing and a multiple winner of the ALFA indoor rowing competition.

Achievements
European Championship Medals: 1 Bronze
U23 World Championship Medals: 2 Silver, 1 Bronze
Junior World Championship Medals: 1 Gold, 1 Silver

World Rowing Championships
2007 – 14th, Double sculls (with Jevgenia Rõndina)
2009 – 11th, Single sculls
2011 – 12th, Single sculls
2014 – 21st, Double sculls (with Marliis Reinkort)

European Rowing Championships
2008 – 14th, Single sculls
2009 – 6th, Double sculls (with Sille Vaiksaar)
2010 – 6th, Single sculls
2011 – 7th, Single sculls
2012 – Bronze , Single sculls
2013 – 7th, Single sculls
2014 – 14th, Single sculls

U23 World Rowing Championships
2006 – 5th, Double sculls (with Jevgenia Rõndina)
2008 – 5th, Single sculls
2009 – Silver , Single sculls
2010 – Silver , Single sculls
2011 – Bronze , Single sculls

Junior World Rowing Championships
2004 – 7th, Single sculls
2005 – 8th, Single sculls
2006 – Gold , Double sculls (with Jevgenia Rõndina)
2007 – Silver , Double sculls (with Jevgenia Rõndina)

Rowing World Cup

Personal
Her older brother Raimo is a former volleyball player who played professionally in Estonia, Austria, Belgium and France. He was a member of the Estonian national team from 2000 to 2014 and represented his country at the 2009 and 2011 European Volleyball Championships.

References

External links 
 
 Biography at esbl.com 

1989 births
Estonian female rowers
Living people
Sportspeople from Pärnu
European Rowing Championships medalists